Wuhan Botanical Garden, or WBG, located in Wuhan, Hubei, China, has a collection of more than 4000 species of flora. WBG has a regular program to educate and create awareness about plant life and biodiversity amongst the general public.

The Wuhan Botanical Garden was created in 1956. It opened to the public two years later. The garden is one of China's three research-oriented botanical gardens. The garden was established to develop and maintain plant collections for purposes of display, conservation, education and research.

Wuhan Botanical Garden has 16 specialty gardens. Its Kiwifruit Garden and the National Kiwifruit Germplasm Repository contain over 70 percent of the world's kiwifruit species. Similarly, the Aquatic Plant Garden is the largest of its kind in the world. Its Wild Fruit Garden, the Rare and Endangered Plant Garden, and the Medicinal Herb Garden are the largest in China.

Location
WBG is located in the eastern part of the city, on a peninsula in the East Lake. The garden has an area of 70 hectares and has several landscapes, and different types of gardens, which include:

Specialty Gardens
Aquatic Plant Garden
Rare Endangered Plant Garden
Chinese Gooseberry Garden
Ornamental Garden
Tree Garden
Pine and Cypress Garden
Bamboo Garden

WBG has emerged as the largest biodiversity protection base of Central China, and a base for north subtropical flora in entire China.

WBG's activities also include organizing symposia. It has relations with around 44 countries for seed exchange and technique cooperation.

WBG's contributions include assisting the city of Wuhan and Hubei province in protecting the environment.

Since its inception, WBG has selected and bred more than forty new varieties of fruit trees, and has undertaken extensive forestation and cultivation of medicinal plants.

Its contributions include plant propagation spreading technique, consultancy, training, and planning for afforesting activities.

References 

Botanical gardens in China
Gardens in China
Tourist attractions in Wuhan